Craig Coyle (born 6 September 1980 in Edinburgh) is a Scottish former footballer that played as a goalkeeper in the Scottish Football League for Raith Rovers, Greenock Morton, Arbroath, Berwick Rangers and is goalkeeper coach since 2012 at Hamilton Academical.

Career
Coyle started his career at Raith Rovers playing seven times for the club. In August 2001, he signed for Greenock Morton.

In March 2005, Coyle was released by Morton and signed for Arbroath until the end of the 2004–05 season. At the end of the season he joined Third Division club Berwick Rangers.

After leaving Berwick in 2006, Coyle joined the junior ranks moving to Bonnyrigg Rose Athletic in the town of Bonnyrigg in Midlothian, where he won the Scottish Junior Football East Region Super League in the 2008–09 season.

He then signed for Linlithgow Rose after leaving Bonnyrigg, but decided to retire at the end of 2009.

Coyle recently achieved his Goalkeeping Licence Diploma from the SFA.

He is now the goalkeeper coach at Hamilton Academical and was registered as a player in April 2014 as emergency cover for Kevin Cuthbert and Blair Currie.

References

External links

Scottish footballers
Association football goalkeepers
Raith Rovers F.C. players
Greenock Morton F.C. players
Arbroath F.C. players
Berwick Rangers F.C. players
Bonnyrigg Rose Athletic F.C. players
Hamilton Academical F.C. players
Footballers from Edinburgh
1980 births
Living people
Scottish Football League players
Scottish Junior Football Association players
Linlithgow Rose F.C. players
Penicuik Athletic F.C. players